Hervaine Moukam (born 24 May 1994) is a Cameroonian-born French professional footballer who plays for Qingdao Youth Island.

Career

Club
On 8 January 2021, Moukam signed for FC Aktobe.

References

External links 
 
 Player's profile at pressball.by

1995 births
Living people
French footballers
French sportspeople of Cameroonian descent
Association football midfielders
French expatriate footballers
Expatriate footballers in Greece
Expatriate footballers in Belarus
Expatriate footballers in Kazakhstan
Expatriate footballers in China
FC Metz players
Asteras Tripolis F.C. players
Olympiacos Volos F.C. players
CSO Amnéville players
FC Neman Grodno players
FC BATE Borisov players
FC Aktobe players